The Benefit of the Doubt is a 2017 Belgian thriller film directed and written by Samuel Tilman in his directorial debut. The film had its world premiere at the Festival International du Film Francophone de Namur on 3 October 2017. It received seven nominations at the 9th Magritte Awards, including Best First Feature Film and Best Actress for Natacha Régnier.

Cast
 Fabrizio Rongione as David
 Natacha Régnier as Julie
 Baptiste Lalieu as Noël
 Myriem Akheddiou as Cathy
 Christophe Paou as Marco
 Yoann Blanc as Fabian
 Steve Driesen as Simon
 Erika Sainte as Maud
 Naïma Ostrowski as Jeanne
 Gilles Remiche as Vendeur

Accolades

References

External links
 

2017 films
2017 thriller films
Belgian thriller films
French thriller films
2010s French-language films
Swiss thriller films
2017 directorial debut films
French-language Swiss films
2010s French films